Roosevelt Stadium was a baseball stadium at Droyer's Point in Jersey City, New Jersey. It opened in April 1937 and hosted high-minor league baseball, 15 major league baseball games, plus championship boxing matches, top-name musical acts, an annual championship drum and bugle corps competition known as "The Dream" Held 1946–1983, important regional high school football and even soccer matches. It was demolished in 1985.

History

Construction
It was expected to cost $500,000 and be built by Spring 1930. Mayor Hague planned for the stadium to have 35,000 permanent seats with ground space for an additional 15,000. It would be a multi-purpose stadium for baseball, football, track and field events, and boxing.

Roosevelt Stadium was finally built in 1937, as a Works Progress Administration project on the grounds of what was the Jersey City Airport at Droyer's Point. The airport was operated by Eddie August Schneider starting in 1935. It was named for President Franklin D. Roosevelt, the author of that New Deal agency. It was designed in Art Deco style.

The ballpark's opening was scheduled for April 22, 1937, with the opening of the 1937 International League season. Mayor Hague declared a half-holiday for the city's schools and employees. New York Giants owner Horace Stoneham was expected at the opener along with Senator Harry Moore. Rain washed out the planned events and the opening was moved back to April 23 with Mayor Hague throwing out the first pitch and Sen. Moore and owner Horace Stoneham on hand for the ballpark's dedication.

The Grateful Dead played six concerts at Roosevelt Stadium:  July 18, 1972; September 19, 1972; July 31, 1973; August 1, 1973; August 6, 1974; and August 4, 1976.

Sports
Initially constructed as a home field for Jersey City's International League affiliate of the New York Giants, the Jersey City Giants, the stadium later saw its most common use for high school football, as Jersey City's William L. Dickinson, James J. Ferris, Abraham Lincoln, Henry Snyder high schools and the city's major parochial schools, Hudson Catholic and St. Peter's Prep, all used the stadium, particularly on Thanksgiving Day, when Dickinson and St. Peter's would sell it out.  It was the site, in September 1974, of the game that set the New Jersey state record for consecutive losses by a high school football team at 42, when Dickinson High School lost to Hudson Catholic, 22-0.  The Hawks offense was led by quarterback Steven Neri and halfback Tony Cavallo and Dickinson was held to -2 yards rushing and 18 passing by a Hudson defense led by Steve Cuccinelli, Ray Parente and Bruce Bock.  Neri, Bock, Parente and Cuccinelli have all been inducted into the Hudson Catholic Football program's Wall of Fame. Jersey City State College (now New Jersey City University) played their home football games on Friday nights at Roosevelt stadium during the 1970s.

The games were played partly as a negotiating tactic with the Borough of Brooklyn, in pursuit of a new stadium to replace Ebbets Field. While it had just 24,000 seats as opposed to Ebbets Field's 31,497, Roosevelt Stadium had 10,000 parking spaces compared to Ebbets Field's 700. The Dodgers' negotiation came to naught, and the team moved to Los Angeles in 1958.

It was also the home field of the Jersey City Giants, a farm team of the New York Giants in the Triple-A International League from 1937 to 1950, the Jersey City Jerseys of the IL in 1960 and 1961, the Jersey City Indians of the Double-A Eastern League in 1977 and, following a change in minor-league affiliation, the Jersey City A's of the EL in 1978.

On April 18, 1946, Roosevelt Stadium hosted the Jersey City Giants' season opener against the Montreal Royals, marking the professional debut of the Royals' Jackie Robinson.  In his five trips to the plate, Robinson got four hits, including a three-run homer, scored four runs and drove in three; he also stole two bases in the Royals' 14-1 victory.

The Giants finished first in the IL in 1939 and 1947, but no Jersey City team ever went on to win a pennant in postseason play. Hague routinely hawked opening day tickets for "Little Giants" games, selling 40,000 seats in a stadium that held only 24,000. When asked about the discrepancy, he was reported to have said "Hell of a crowd in the men's rooms."

In 1940, former heavyweight champion Max Baer beat "Two Ton Tony" Galento at Roosevelt Stadium. In 1948 Marcel Cerdan defeated Tony Zale in a middleweight championship title fight.  In 1950, Sugar Ray Robinson defended his welterweight title.

In 1971, the stadium was selected to host an NASL and international soccer double-header.  Bologna were to meet West Ham United while the New York Cosmos were to play the Dallas Tornado in the opener.  A week later, Santos (Brazil) were scheduled to meet Bologna with Pelé announced.  The first doubleheader was set for Yankee Stadium in NY but the contract that the Cosmos had with the Yankees allowed for a "weather clause" in which the baseball team could cancel if bad weather conditions posed a potential threat to the field.

Demolition
In November 1982, the Jersey City City Council voted to demolish the stadium. It was finally demolished in 1985, and a gated community named Droyer's Point opened on the site in 1987.

See also
Jersey City Armory
Boyle's Thirty Acres

References

External links

Info about the stadium
Info about the Grateful Dead concert
Collection of photos and drawings
Digital Ballparks: Roosevelt Stadium
MLB games at Roosevelt Stadium

Art Deco architecture in New Jersey
Brooklyn Dodgers stadiums
Buildings and structures in Jersey City, New Jersey
Baseball venues in New Jersey
Culture of Jersey City, New Jersey
Defunct baseball venues in the United States
Defunct Major League Baseball venues
Defunct minor league baseball venues
Demolished sports venues in New Jersey
Sports in Hudson County, New Jersey
Works Progress Administration in New Jersey
1937 establishments in New Jersey
1985 disestablishments in New Jersey
Sports venues completed in 1937
Sports venues demolished in 1985